Symphlebia lophocampoides is a moth in the subfamily Arctiinae. It was described by Felder and Rogenhofer in 1874. It is found in Brazil.

References

Moths described in 1874
Symphlebia